Ray Edward Harry Collins, Baron Collins of Highbury (born 21 December 1954) is a British politician and trade unionist serving as a Member of the House of Lords since 2011. A member of the Labour Party, he has been Shadow Deputy Leader of the House of Lords since 2021. Collins served as General Secretary of the Labour Party from 2008 to 2011, and has held several opposition front bench posts in the Lords since 2011.

Trade unionist
Collins was appointed Central Office Manager of the Transport and General Workers' Union in 1984 and held essentially the same post until 2008, being redesignated Head of Administration in the 1990s and Assistant General Secretary in 1999. He has been a member of the Labour Party for over thirty years and has campaigned for the party in every General Election since 1970. He was TGWU representative on the Labour Party National Policy Forum and a member of Labour's National Constitutional Committee. 

He helped steer the TGWU into a merger with Amicus, creating Unite, one of the largest trade unions in the country.

Labour Party
Collins took the helm because the party was reportedly close to bankruptcy. In May 2008, Electoral Commission figures showed the party was £17.8 million in debt.

On 20 January 2011, Collins was created a life peer as Baron Collins of Highbury, of Highbury in the London Borough of Islington, and was introduced in the House of Lords on 24 January 2011, where he sits on the Labour benches. He was appointed a whip in 2011. He was appointed Labour's Lords Spokesperson for International Development in 2013.

On 10 July 2013 Collins was asked to review and make recommendations for internal Labour Party reform. His recommendations included replacing the electoral college system for selecting new leaders with a "one member, one vote" system. Mass membership would be encouraged by allowing "registered supporters" to join at a low cost, as well as full membership. Members from the trade unions would also have to explicitly "opt in" rather than "opt out" of paying a political levy to Labour. On 1 March 2014, at a special conference, the party largely adopted these recommendations.

Personal life
Collins married his partner Rafael in 2014.
He received a grant of arms, crest, supporters and badge from Garter Woodcock on 12 June 2015.

References

1954 births
English trade unionists
Labour Party (UK) life peers
Life peers created by Elizabeth II
Living people
Gay politicians
People from Newport, Isle of Wight
Alumni of the University of Kent
English LGBT politicians
LGBT life peers